Pugliese (born 7 March 1997) is an Argentine professional footballer who plays as a forward for Chacarita, on loan from Club Atlético Platense.

Career
Pugliese is a product of the Platense academy. He made the move into senior football in 2017–18 under Fernando Ruiz, who selected Pugliese for his professional debut in November 2017. He was substituted on at the interval of a Primera B Metropolitana match with Comunicaciones, going on to score the club's only goal in a 1–1 draw. Another goal followed on 13 April 2018 versus Barracas Central, as he ended the season with six appearances, all of which off the bench, as Platense won the league title. His first start arrived in September against Deportivo Morón in Primera B Nacional. 

In February 2021, Pugliese was loaned out to Estudiantes de Buenos Aires until the end of 2021. However, the loan spell was cut short, as Platense announced on 29 July 2021, that Pugliese had moved to Club Atlético Mitre instead, once again on a loan deal until the end of 2021. Ahead of the 2022 season, he was sent out on a new loan spell, this time to San Telmo.

Career statistics
.

Honours
Platense
Primera B Metropolitana: 2017–18

References

External links

1997 births
Living people
Footballers from Buenos Aires
Argentine footballers
Association football forwards
Primera B Metropolitana players
Primera Nacional players
Club Atlético Platense footballers
Estudiantes de Buenos Aires footballers
Club Atlético Mitre footballers
San Telmo footballers